The Hampton School District is a community public school district that serves students in pre-kindergarten through fifth grade from Hampton, in Hunterdon County, New Jersey, United States.

As of the 2018–19 school year, the district, comprising one school, had an enrollment of 91 students and 14.1 classroom teachers (on an FTE basis), for a student–teacher ratio of 6.5:1. In the 2016–17 school year, Hampton was the 15th-smallest enrollment of any school district in the state, with 128 students.

The district is classified by the New Jersey Department of Education as being in District Factor Group "DE", the fifth-highest of eight groupings. District Factor Groups organize districts statewide to allow comparison by common socioeconomic characteristics of the local districts. From lowest socioeconomic status to highest, the categories are A, B, CD, DE, FG, GH, I and J.

Starting in the 2018–19 school year, middle school students in grades 6 through 8 are sent to the Lebanon Township Schools on a tuition basis as part of a sending/receiving relationship. As of the 2018–19 school year, Woodglen School had an enrollment of 320 students and 30.6 classroom teachers (on an FTE basis), for a student–teacher ratio of 10.5:1.

Students in public school for ninth through twelfth grades attend Voorhees High School, which also serves the communities of Califon, Glen Gardner (the home of the school), High Bridge, Lebanon Township and Tewksbury Township. As of the 2018–19 school year, the high school had an enrollment of 982 students and 83.1 classroom teachers (on an FTE basis), for a student–teacher ratio of 11.8:1. The school is part of the North Hunterdon-Voorhees Regional High School District, which also serves students from Bethlehem Township, Clinton Town, Clinton Township, Franklin Township, Lebanon Borough and Union Township at North Hunterdon High School in Clinton Township.

School
The Hampton Public School served an enrollment of 97 students as of the 2018–19 school year.
Ruth Ann Dalrymple, Principal

Administration
Core members of the district's administration are:
Jason Kornegay, Superintendent
Marci Krasny, Business Administrator / Board Secretary

Board of education
The district's board of education, with five members, sets policy and oversees the fiscal and educational operation of the district through its administration. As a Type II school district, the board's trustees are elected directly by voters to serve three-year terms of office on a staggered basis, with either one or two seats up for election each year held (since 2012) as part of the November general election.

References

External links
Hampton Public School

School Data for the Hampton Public School, National Center for Education Statistics
North Hunterdon-Voorhees Regional High School District

Hampton, New Jersey
New Jersey District Factor Group DE
School districts in Hunterdon County, New Jersey
Public K–8 schools in New Jersey